Separado! is a 2010 British documentary film directed by Dylan Goch and focuses on Gruff Rhys going to South America in search of a distant relative René Griffiths.

References

External links
 

2010 documentary films
2010 films
British documentary films
Documentary films about rock music and musicians
Documentary films about families
2010s British films